Greater Tubatse Local Municipality was located in the Sekhukhune District Municipality of Limpopo province, South Africa. In 2016, 3 August, it was merged with the Fetakgomo Local Municipality to form the Fetakgomo Tubatse Local Municipality.

Main places
The 2001 census divided the municipality into the following main places:

Politics 
The municipal council consists of sixty-two members elected by mixed-member proportional representation. Thirty-one councillors are elected by first-past-the-post voting in thirty-one wards, while the remaining thirty-one are chosen from party lists so that the total number of party representatives is proportional to the number of votes received. In the election of 18 May 2011, the African National Congress (ANC) won a majority of fifty seats on the council.
The following table shows the results of the election.

References

External links 
 Official homepage

Local municipalities of the Sekhukhune District Municipality